is not a specific sword, but a common noun for any sword of this length. In Japanese mythology, numerous deities own a sword of this kind.
Some examples of well-known Totsuka-no-Tsurugi:

 The totsuka sword used by Izanagi to kill his offspring Kagu-tsuchi. This one is also named .
 The totsuka sword used in the oath between Amaterasu and Susanoo. Amaterasu received this sword from Susanoo, snapped it to three pieces, and created the Three Munakata Goddesses from its debris. This sword was not named.
 Another totsuka sword in Susanoo's possession, which he used to slay Orochi. The sword is enshrined as the shintai of Isonokami Shrine.
 The totsuka sword wield by Takemikazuchi in quelling of the Middle Country.

Susanoo legend 
After the sword's owner, Susanoo, was banished from heaven by the reason of killing one of Amaterasu's Attendants and destroying her rice fields, he descended to the Province of Izumo where he met Ashinazuchi, an elderly man who told him that the Yamata no Orochi ("Eight-Branched Serpent"), who had consumed seven of his eight daughters, was coming soon to eat the last one: Kushinada-hime.

Susanoo decided to help the family and investigated the creature, soon he begged Ashinazuchi for permission to marry Kushinada-hime, which was granted; having his plan ready, he transformed his wife into a comb so he could have her near in the battle.
As the great snake came, it put each one of his eight heads through the gates the gods built, searching for the daughter; as a bait the gods had put big amounts of sake after each gate, the snake took the bait and got drunk; having an easy chance, Susanoo took the Worochi no Ara-masa and cut every head off the snake, proceeding with the tails, in the fourth one he found an exceptionally great sword, the Kusanagi-no-Tsurugi.

Having the sword in his hands he returned to the heaven offering the sword as a reconciliation gift to his sister Amaterasu.

References 

Regalia
Mythological swords
Individual Japanese swords